Luther Archimède (born 17 September 1999) is a Guadeloupean professional footballer who plays as a forward for USL Championship club Sacramento Republic and the Guadeloupe national team.

Career

Early career
Born in Les Abymes, Guadeloupe, Archimède moved to France and began his career with the youth setup of Istres. In 2016 he joined the academy of Sochaux. He remained with Sochaux for three years before going to the United States to play college soccer for Syracuse Orange.

Sochaux
Archimède joined the Sochaux academy in 2016, coming from Istres. He made his senior debut with Sochaux in a 1-0 Coupe de France loss to Lille OSC on 7 January 2019.

New York Red Bulls 
Archimède was selected 13th overall by New York Red Bulls in the 2021 MLS SuperDraft. On 19 April 2021, Archimède signed with New York Red Bulls II.

Sacramento Republic
On 15 December 2021, Archimède signed with USL Championship side Sacramento Republic ahead of their 2022 season.

International career
Archimède represented the Guadeloupe U20s at the 2018 CONCACAF U-20 Championship and finished as the third top scorer, with 6 goals in 5 games. He made his senior debut for the Guadeloupe national football team in a 1-0 loss to Martinique for 2019–20 CONCACAF Nations League qualifying on 23 March 2019. In 2021, Achimède represented the Guadeloupe national football team in the Gold Cup, where he made two appearances, the first as a substitute and the second as a starter.

References

External links
 
 
 

1999 births
Living people
People from Les Abymes
Guadeloupean footballers
Guadeloupe international footballers
FC Sochaux-Montbéliard players
Ligue 2 players
Championnat National 3 players
Association football forwards
Syracuse Orange men's soccer players
Expatriate soccer players in the United States
French expatriate sportspeople in the United States
Guadeloupean expatriate footballers
New York Red Bulls draft picks
New York Red Bulls II players
2021 CONCACAF Gold Cup players
USL Championship players
Sacramento Republic FC players